Backbone is a unique and difficult solitaire game using two decks of playing cards.  The object of this game is to move all cards to the Foundations.

Rules

In the center are two Reserve Stacks to form the "Backbone".  At the bottom of the "Backbone", there is a card that overlaps both Reserve Stacks.  This card must be played before the remaining "Backbone" cards can be played.  On each side of the "Backbone" are four Tableau Stacks to form the "Ribs".  The Deck is present towards the bottom right.

Backbone has eight Foundations that build up from Ace to King in suit, e.g. A♣, 2♣, 3♣, 4♣...  Cards in the "Backbone" can be moved to a Foundation or Tableau Stack.  The card at the base of the "Backbone" (the Coccyx or "tailbone" card) must be moved before the "Backbone" cards can be played.  The Tableau builds down in suit, e.g. 7♥, 6♥, 5♥...

An emptied stack can be filled with any card from the "Backbone" or Deck.  The stock is dealt one card at a time, and only two passes through the deck are allowed, making this a difficult game to win.  The game is won after all the cards have been moved to the Foundations.

Variations
In the Aisleriot (Linux app) version of the game, cards from the Backbone cannot be played onto an empty stack.  They must be played onto another card in either the Tableau on the Foundation.  Thus, a King in the Backbone can only be played onto a Queen on a Foundation stack.  This makes the game not only tougher, but also more challenging in the use of strategy.

See also
 Herring-Bone 
 List of solitaires
 Glossary of solitaire

References

Bibliography
 Dalton, Basil.  The Complete Patience Book
 Parlett, David.  The Penguin Book of Patience
 Pritchard, D.B. Patience Games

Double-deck patience card games
Mobile games
Reserved packers